The  Arkiv för Matematik is a biannual peer-reviewed open-access scientific journal covering mathematics. The journal was established in 1949 when Arkiv för matematik, astronomi och fysik was split into separate journals, and is currently published by the International Press of Boston on behalf  of the Institut Mittag-Leffler of the Royal Swedish Academy of Sciences. The current Editor-in-Chief is Hans Ringström. 

The journal is indexed by Mathematical Reviews and Zentralblatt MATH. Its 2009 MCQ was 0.47.

According to the Journal Citation Reports, the journal has a 2020 impact factor of 0.896, ranking it 177th out of 330 journals in the category "MATHEMATICS".

References

External links

Open archive on Project Euclid

Mathematics journals
Publications established in 1949
English-language journals
Biannual journals